Nkiru Olumide-Ojo is a Nigerian female author, columnist, development speaker and technocrat, with a career history in financial services, aviation, telecommunication and petroleum sectors.

Education and Career
Nkiru Olumide-Ojo, who grew up in Port-Harcourt, Rivers State, holds a master's degree in Strategic Marketing Management from the Kingston University, Surrey in London, UK. She bagged her postgraduate and first degree in Biological Science at the University of Calabar. She is a member of the Nigerian Institute of Public Relations [NIPR] and Member of the UK Chattered Institute of Marketing United Kingdom.

Nkiru presently works as Executive Head, Regional Marketing and Communication of Standard Bank Group, South Africa. She has worked at CMC Connect Burson-Marsteller, Nigeria, Virgin Atlantic in Nigeria, Virgin Nigeria, Airtel, Forte Oil, among others.

In September 2017, Nkiru Olumide-Ojo's book titled The Pressure Cooker: Lessons from a Woman at Work was published by Narrative Landscape Press. The book is a culmination of Nkiru's weekly column in Business Day (Nigeria) newspaper, which focused on issues related to women and the workplace. The 128-page, nine-chapter book mirrors prospects, exploits and challenges of women in the professional environment, offering "pragmatic insights into how women can be successful in their careers, while also maintaining a decent homefront."

An advocate of women's issues, Nkiru is co-founder of The Lighthouse Network, a social development initiative with programmes geared towards empowering women in professional career and entrepreneurship, and also preparing young women for work place through a formal mentoring structure. She is a public speaker.

Awards and recognition
Nkiru has won the Best Corporate Brand Manager Award  at the 2017 Brands & Marketing Awards organised by Brand Journalists' Association of Nigeria (BJAN). In the year year, she was honoured with Leading Marketing Personality of the Year by Marketing Edge. She was recognized in 2008 and 2016 as one of the Leading Women in Marketing and Communication by Marketing World West Africa. She was one of women recognised by Nigerians in Diasporas Professional (NIPRO) as 'Top 40 Females Under 40' of 40  part of Nigerians in Diasporas Professional (NIPRO)’s 'Top 40 Females Under 40' in 2004. She is one of those featured in a report, Africa’s leading women in PR and Marketing, which mirrors top women professionals in the field of public relations and marketing in Africa.

Nkiru is a member, Advisory Board of The Luxury Report, a luxury published in Nigeria. She reportedly "sits on the board of two commercial organisations". She is 2nd Vice-President of the Advertisers Association of Nigeria.

Personal life
Nkiru married to Olumide Ojo, both of whom have two kids. .

References

External links 
Lighthouse Network

Living people
Nigerian women in business
Nigerian social entrepreneurs
Year of birth missing (living people)